The pair skating event was held as part of the figure skating at the 1932 Winter Olympics. It was the fifth appearance of the event, which had previously been held twice at the Summer Olympics in 1908 and 1920 and twice at the Winter Games in 1924 and 1928. The competition was held on Friday 12 February 1932. Fourteen figure skaters from four nations competed.

Results
Andrée Brunet / Pierre Brunet successfully defended their 1928 title.

Referee:
  Joel B. Liberman

Judges:
  Jenő Minnich
  Yngvar Bryn
  Hans Grünauer
  Walter Jakobsson
  Georges Torchon
  Herbert J. Clarke
  Charles M. Rotch

References

External links
 Official Olympic Report
 sports-reference
 

Figure skating at the 1932 Winter Olympics
1932 in figure skating
1932
Mixed events at the 1932 Winter Olympics